"Fiction" is a song by the American heavy metal band Avenged Sevenfold. It was released on their fifth studio album, Nightmare. The song was written by the band's original drummer Jimmy "The Rev" Sullivan, who died in December 2009. The song is a duet between The Rev and singer M. Shadows.

Background
On December 28, 2009, the Rev was found unresponsive in his Huntington Beach home, and was later pronounced dead upon arrival to the hospital. Shortly after his death, Avenged Sevenfold dedicated their fifth studio album Nightmare to him.

"Fiction" was the final song The Rev wrote. Parts of "Fiction" were originally conceived by The Rev for Pinkly Smooth. It was written only three days before his death, under the title "Death". M. Shadows and Synyster Gates stated in an interview to Hard Drive Radio:

Portions of the "Death" demo have leaked on YouTube.

Recording
"Fiction" is one of only two songs featuring The Rev on Nightmare, although his writing and drum arrangements are featured on every song. The song features The Rev on lead vocals, along with Shadows. The Rev's favorite drummer, Mike Portnoy (then of Dream Theater) was brought on to finish drums on the album. On this song specifically, Portnoy said he "had to play it exactly as (Jimmy) left it." The song is the only Avenged Sevenfold song not to feature any guitar playing.

Personnel

Avenged Sevenfold
 M. Shadows – co-lead vocals, piano
 The Rev – co-lead vocals, drum arrangement 
 Johnny Christ – bass guitar

Session musicians
 Mike Portnoy – drums, percussion
 David Palmer – piano
 Stevie Blacke – strings, string arrangement
 Jessi Collins – backing vocals

Production
 Mike Elizondo – producer, keyboards
 Craig Aaronson – A&R
 Brent Arrowood – assistant engineer
 Chad Carlisle – assistant engineer
 D.A. Frizell – illustrations, treatment
 Adam Hawkins – engineer
 Ted Jensen – mastering
 Jodie Levine – production co-ordination, contractor
 Clay Patrick McBride – photography
 Andy Olyphant – A&R
 Paul Suarez – pro-tools
 Jan Petrow – assistant engineer
 Cam Rackman – paintings, portraits
 Rafa Alcantra – art direction, photography, layouts
 Travis Smith – cover art, tray card art
 Joanna Terrasi – production co-ordination, contractor
 Andy Wallace – mixer

References

Avenged Sevenfold songs
2010 songs